The Chevalier Guard Regiment was a Russian heavy cavalry guard regiment, created in 1800 by the reformation of the Chevalier Guard corps, itself created in 1764 by Catherine the Great. As other Russian heavy cavalry guard regiments (the Life-Guards Horse Regiment, His Majesty's Life-Guards Cuirassier Regiment, and Her Majesty's Life-Guards Cuirassier Regiment), the Chevalier Guards were equipped as cuirassiers (with some differences in uniform and equipment from army cuirassiers and other guard cuirassier regiments).

Campaigns 

 1805 – The regiment first saw combat in the Battle of Austerlitz, in which it fought bravely, covering the retreat of units from the Preobrazhensky and Semenovsky Regiments of the Russian Imperial Guard infantry. The Chevalier Guards were countercharged and defeated by the French Horse Grenadiers of the Old Guard, who inflicted heavy casualties among the Russians.
 1807 – Battle of Heilsberg
 1812 – The regiment distinguished itself during the Patriotic War of 1812. The Chevalier Guards lost their colonel early in the Battle of Borodino but, in concert with the Life Guard Horse Regiment, effectively stopped the decisive charge of Saxon cuirassier regiments and defeated French Horse Carabiniers.
 1813 – Lützen, Kulm, Leipzig
 1814 – Fère-Champenoise
 1831 – Polish Campaign
 1914 – First World War
The regiment was disbanded in 1918.

Many famous men served as Chevalier Guards including Georges-Charles de Heeckeren d'Anthès, Grigory Potemkin, Denis Davydov, Mikhail Skobelev, Alexander Rodzyanko, Pavlo Skoropadskyi, Carl Gustaf Emil Mannerheim and Alexander Ypsilantis.

Gallery

References

External links
 Russian Imperial Guard
 Russian Imperial Guard During the Napoleonic Wars

Cavalry regiments of the Russian Empire
Former guards regiments
Military units and formations established in 1800
Military units and formations disestablished in 1918
Russian military units and formations of the Napoleonic Wars
Russian Imperial Guard
1800 establishments in the Russian Empire
1918 disestablishments in Russia
Saint Petersburg Governorate
Guards regiments of the Russian Empire